Idahlu or Idehlu or Idehloo or Eydehlu, also rendered as Idalu or Idelu or Eydlu, may refer to various places in Iran:
 Idahlu, Charuymaq, East Azerbaijan Province 
 Idahlu, Khoda Afarin, East Azerbaijan Province
 Eydlu, East Azerbaijan Province
 Idehlu, Sarab, East Azerbaijan Province
 Idahlu-ye Bozorg, East Azerbaijan Province
 Idahlu-ye Khalifeh, East Azerbaijan Province
 Idahlu-ye Kuchek, East Azerbaijan Province
 Idahlu-ye Khan, East Azerbaijan Province
 Idahlu, Hamadan
 Idahlu, Kabudarahang, Hamadan Province
 Idahlu, Kurdistan
 Idahlu, Mahneshan, Zanjan Province

See also
 Ideluy (disambiguation), various places in Iran
 Eydlu, East Azerbaijan Province, Iran